Karianne Eikeland (born 16 November 1972) is a world champion and Olympic Norwegian sailor. She was born in Bergen, and has sailed for the Bergens Seilforening, the Royal Norwegian Yacht Club, and Asker Seilforening. 

She won the Women's World Championship in the Snipe class in 2000.

She competed at the 2004 Summer Olympics in Athens, where she placed ninth in the Yngling class, together with Beate Kristiansen and Lise Birgitte Fredriksen.

References

External links

 

1972 births
Living people
Norwegian female sailors (sport)
Olympic sailors of Norway
Sportspeople from Bergen
Sailors at the 2004 Summer Olympics – Yngling
Snipe class female world champions
World champions in sailing for Norway